The 2016–17 Melbourne Victory W-League season was the club's ninth season in the W-League, the premier competition for women's football in Australia.

Players

Squad information
Melbourne Victory's women squad for the 2016–17 W-League.

Transfers in

Transfers out

Contract extensions

Managerial staff

Statistics

Squad statistics

Competitions

W-League

League table

Results summary

Results by round

Fixtures
 Click here for season fixtures.

References

External links
 Official Website

Melbourne Victory FC (A-League Women) seasons
Melbourne Victory